Diego de Arce (1554–1617) was a Roman Catholic prelate who served as Bishop of Cassano all'Jonio (1614–1617).

Biography
Giovanni Battista Lanfranchi was born in Madrid, Spain in 1554 and ordained a priest in the Order of Friars Minor.  On 17 Feb 1614, he was appointed during the papacy of Pope Paul V as Bishop of Cassano all'Jonio. He served as Bishop of Cassano all'Jonio until his death in 1617.

References

External links and additional sources
 (for Chronology of Bishops) 
 (for Chronology of Bishops)  

1554 births
1617 deaths
16th-century Italian Roman Catholic bishops
17th-century Italian Roman Catholic bishops
Bishops appointed by Pope Paul V
Franciscan bishops